is a passenger railway station located in the city of Sanuki, Kagawa Prefecture, Japan. It is operated by JR Shikoku and has the station number "T19".

Lines
The station is served by the JR Shikoku Kōtoku Line and is located 16.3 km from the beginning of the line at Takamatsu.

Layout
Shido Station consists of a side platform and an island platform serving three tracks. The present station building, completed in 1998 is a  structure where passenger facilities are located on a bridge which spans the tracks. The station entrance is on the north side  of the tracks from where elevators and stairs lead to the bridge structure on level 2 which houses ticket gates, a waiting room and a JR ticket window (with a Midori no Madoguchi facility). From the bridge, separate stairs and elevators connect to all platforms. The bridge also connects to a second station entrance from road on the south side of the tracks, where there is a roundabout and parking lots for cars. A JR Travel Centre (Warp Plaza) is located on level 1 of the station building.

History
At that time the station was operated by Japanese Government Railways, later becoming Japanese National Railways (JNR). With the privatization of JNR on 1 April 1987, control of the station passed to JR Shikoku.

Surrounding area
Sanuki City Hall
Sanuki Municipal Shido Elementary School
Sanuki Municipal Shido Junior High School
Kagawa Prefectural Shido High School

See also
List of railway stations in Japan

References

External links

Shido Station (JR Shikoku)

Railway stations in Kagawa Prefecture
Railway stations in Japan opened in 1925
Sanuki, Kagawa